In criminal law, guilt is the state of being responsible for the commission of an offense. Legal guilt is entirely externally defined by the state, or more generally a "court of law". Being "guilty" of a criminal offense means that one has committed a violation of criminal law, or performed all the elements of the offense set out by a criminal statute. The determination that one has committed that violation is made by an external body (a "court of law") after the determination of the facts by a finder of fact or “factfinder” (i.e. a jury) and is, therefore, as definitive as the record-keeping of the body. For instance, in the case of a bench trial a judge acts as both the court of law and the factfinder, whereas in a jury trial the jury is the trier of fact and the judge acts only as the trier of law. Thus, the most basic definition is fundamentally circular: a person is guilty of violating a law if a factfinder in a court of law so says.

Philosophically, guilt in criminal law is a reflection of a functioning society and its ability to condemn individuals' actions. It rests fundamentally on a presumption of free will, in which individuals choose actions and are, therefore, subjected to external judgement of the rightness or wrongness of those actions. As described by Judge Alvin B. Rubin in United States v. Lyons (1984):

Moral and legal definitions

"Guilt" is the obligation of a person who has violated a moral standard to bear the sanctions imposed by that moral standard. In legal terms, guilt means having been found to have violated a criminal law, though law also raises 'the issue of defences, pleas, the mitigation of offences, and the defeasibility of claims'.

Les Parrott draws a three-fold distinction between "objective or legal guilt, which occurs when society's laws have been broken... social guilt...[over] an unwritten law of social expectation", and finally the way "personal guilt occurs when someone compromises one's own standards".

Remedies
Guilt can sometimes be remedied by: punishment (a common action and advised or required in many legal and moral codes); forgiveness (as in transformative justice); making amends (see reparation or acts of reparation), or "restitution ... an important step in finding freedom from real guilt'; or by sincere remorse (as with confession in Catholicism or restorative justice). Guilt can also be remedied through intellectualisation or cognition  (the understanding that the source of the guilty feelings was illogical or irrelevant). Helping other people can also help relieve guilt feelings: "thus guilty people are often helpful people ... helping, like receiving an external reward, seemed to get people feeling better". There are also the so-called "Don Juans of achievement ... who pay the installments due their superego not by suffering but by achievements.... Since no achievement succeeds in really undoing the unconscious guilt, these persons are compelled to run from one achievement to another".

Law does not usually accept the agent's self-punishment, but some ancient codes did: in Athens, the accused could propose their own remedy, which could, in fact, be a reward, while the accuser proposed another, and the jury chose something in-between. This forced the accused to effectively bet on his support in the community, as Socrates did when he proposed "room and board in the town hall" as his fate. He lost and drank hemlock, a poison, as advised by his accuser.

See also

 Culpability
 Erinyes
 Malum in se
 Malum prohibitum

References

External links

    by Gary Gilley
   by Gerd Altendorff translation by Jochen Reiss
 Learnt or innate
 

Criminal procedure
 
Criminal law legal terminology